École Française d'Abuja Marcel Pagnol is a French international school in Kaura District, Abuja, Nigeria. It serves levels maternelle (preschool) through lycée (senior high school or sixth form). As of 2015 the school directly teaches until troisième and uses the National Centre for Distance Education (CNED) distance education programme for seconde and prèmiere ES.

It is adjacent to the Prince and Princess Estate and is in proximity to the Kaura Market, in southern Abuja.

History
It opened in 1998 in a campus at Life Camp BNL; its current Prince and Princess Estate campus opened in April 2010. Construction began  on the current campus in September 2009.

See also

 Institut français du Nigeria

References

External links
  École Française Marcel Pagnol
  

International schools in Abuja
French international schools in Nigeria
Marcel Pagnol
1998 establishments in Nigeria
Educational institutions established in 1998